(Alexander) Gavin Henderson, 2nd Baron Faringdon (20 March 1902 – 29 January 1977) was a British Labour politician and pacifist. He is most known for his charity work, his heavy financial support of medical aid programmes, and for housing 40 child refugees fleeing Hitler-backed fascist forces during the Spanish Civil War.

Early and personal life 
Henderson was the son of Lt-Col. the Hon. Harold Henderson and grew up in Shellingford. He was sent to Eton College, then attended McGill University in Montreal, before graduating from Christ Church, Oxford, in 1924. At Oxford he was part of the Hypocrites' Club.

Described by David Cargill as a "roaring pansy", Henderson was known for his effeminate demeanour, once opening a speech in the House of Lords with the words "My dears" instead of "My Lords". Historians have noted how various sources describe Henderson as a homosexual. His marriage, to the Hon. Honor Chedworth Philipps (the daughter of Owen Philipps, 1st Baron Kylsant), was childless and lasted only four years (consecrated in 1927; annulled in 1931). After his divorce, he never married again.

Early political career 
He succeeded to the title of 2nd Baron Faringdon, and inherited the estate of Buscot Park from his grandfather Alexander Henderson, 1st Baron Faringdon in 1934. In early life he had been prominent among the bright young things. In opposition to his family's strict conservative politics, Henderson joined the Labour Party in the late 1930s, and sat as a Labour peer in the House of Lords. Henderson used his position as a peer to campaign for Labour candidates on their behalf, and he also joined the Parliamentary Pacifist Group.

Experiences during the Spanish Civil War 
Henderson was a keen supporter of the Republican cause and anti-fascist forces during the Spanish Civil War. He joined the Spanish Medical Aid Committee (SMAC) when it was first established in 1936, and later travelled to Spain to visit numerous front-line hospitals. During the war, Henderson donated his Rolls-Royce car and had it converted into a makeshift ambulance to serve republicans and anti-fascists. This ambulance saw frequent use and was in action during the Battle of Teruel where it was used to evacuate people with serious abdominal wounds. Henderson's Rolls-Royce ambulance, though heavily damaged and covered in bullet holes, survived the war and was shipped back to Britain in September 1938. The ambulance was then displayed at a conference for officials of the UK Trades Union Congress (TUC), where it was used to raise monetary funds for Spanish medical programmes.

After the collapse of the Spanish Republican forces, Henderson was involved in the evacuation of Quakers and workers from Save the Children at the British built port of Gandia. Henderson stood at the entrance of the port and laid a Union Jack at the entrance, refusing to allow entry to an army patrol of the fascist forces, claiming that the port was "British territory".

Later career and charitable work 
Henderson returned to the UK after the Spanish Civil War and continued to use his political position to campaign on behalf of Republican causes. Together with the help of other public figures including Peter Churchill and Sir Stafford Cripps, Henderson led a left-wing organisation known as the Friends of the Spanish People (FSP), and helped to run their newspaper, Spanish News. In March 1938, Henderson had given several cottages and his lodge on Buscot Park estate to 40 Spanish refugee children, and later several notable Spanish exiles including Arturo Barea Ogazon.

Henderson's pacificist beliefs exempted him from fighting in WWII, and instead he served in both the London Fire Brigade, and Bristol, during World War II. During his time with the London Fire Brigade, he once entered the House of Lords whilst still wearing his fireman's uniform.

Post-war he was a prominent member of the Fabian Society, and also served on the London County Council. He was elected as a councillor on 16 April 1958 for the Woolwich West division but was defeated by a Conservative at the 1961 election. Following his defeat, he was appointed an alderman, a post he held until 1965. Henderson became an authority on Georgian architecture and spent the remainder of his life working to preserve historic British buildings, most notably British country homes. He also then served on the Greater London Council's Historic Buildings Committee.

Gavin Henderson died in 1977 without issue, and was succeeded by his nephew Charles Michael Henderson as 3rd Baron Faringdon.

Arms

References

 

1902 births
1977 deaths
Barons in the Peerage of the United Kingdom
Chairs of the Fabian Society
English LGBT politicians
Labour Party (UK) hereditary peers
People from Vale of White Horse (district)
Members of London County Council
LGBT peers
People educated at Eton College
McGill University alumni
Alumni of Christ Church, Oxford
20th-century English LGBT people